This list includes fleet organisations of the Ottoman Navy during the Balkan Wars.

Dispositions on October 10, 1912 
On October 10, 1912, the naval ships of the Ottoman Navy was disposed as follows:

Haydarpaşa, Constantinople (present day: Istanbul)
Golden Horn (shipyard), Constantinople
Golden Horn, Constantinople
,  
Dolmabahçe, Constantinople

Kabataş, Constantinople
Istanbul (tug)
Arnavutköy, Constantinople

Bosporus-Büyükdere, Constantinople
Sinop

Çanakkale
Preveza
Salonika (present day: Thessaloniki)
Feth-i Bülend, 
Smyrna (present day: İzmir)
Suez
, Beyrut,

Fleet organisation on October 16, 1912 
On October 16, 1912, the Ottoman Navy was structured as follows:

Bosporus Fleet (Commander: Kalyon Kaptanı Tahir Bey)
Barbaros Hayreddin (Korvet Kaptanı Enver Hakkı Efendi), Turgut Reis (Korvet Kaptanı İsmail Ahmer Efendi), Muâvenet-i Millîye (Birinci Sınıf Yüzbaşı Galatalı Ali Bey), Yâdigâr-ı Millet (Birinci Sınıf Yüzbaşı Fahri Cemal Bey), Nümûne-i Hamiyet (Korvet Kaptanı Hamdi Mahmud Bey), Samsun (Birinci Sınıf Yüzbaşı Osman İzzet Bey), Basra (Birinci Sınıf Yüzbaşı Cemal Ali Bey), Taşoz, Musul, Akhisar, Sultanhisar, Sivrihisar, Zuhaf, Nevşehir
Derdanelles Fleet (Commander: Korvet Kaptanı Tevfik Bey)　
Mesudiye (Korvet Kaptanı Tevfik Bey), Âsâr-ı Tevfik (Korvet Kaptanı Mehmed Emin Bey), Hamidabad
Black Sea Headquarters (Commander: Birinci Sınıf Yüzbaşı Hüseyin Rauf Bey)
Hamidiye (Birinci Sınıf Yüzbaşı Hüseyin Rauf Bey), Mecidiye (Korvet Kaptanı Arif Nebil Bey)
Tersâne-i Âmire
Berk-i Satvet, Gayret-i Vatâniye, Yarhisar, Berk Efşan, Kütahya, Draç, Demirhisar

Fleet organisation on December 19, 1912 
On December 19, 1912, the Ottoman Navy was structured as follows:

Armoured Warship Division (Commander: Kalyon Kaptanı Ramiz Bey)
Barbasos Hayreddin, Turgut Reis, Mesudiye, Âsâr-ı Tevfik, Demirhisar, Sultanhisar, Sivrihisar, Hamidabad
1st Destroyer Division (Commander: Birinci Sınıf Yüzbaşı Hüseyin Rauf Bey)
Berk-i Satvet, Yâdigâr-ı Millet, Muâvenet-i Millîye, Taşoz, Basra
2nd Destroyer Division (Commander: Yüzbaşı Hakkı Eşref Efendi)
Mecidiye, Nümûne-i Hamiyet, Gayret-i Vatâniye, Yarhisar
3rd Division (Commander: Korvet Kaptanı İsmail Bey)
Tîr-i Müjgan (workshop ship), İntibâh (salvage tug), Reşid Paşa (hospital ship), Samsun, Akhisar, Samsun (tug)

Fleet organisation on December 20, 1912 
On December 20, 1912, the Ottoman Navy was structured as follows:

Armoured Warship Division (Commander: Kalyon Kaptanı Ramiz Bey)
Barbasos Hayreddin, Turgut Reis, Mesudiye, Demirhisar, Sultanhisar, Sivrihisar, Hamidabad, Reşid Paşa (hospital ship)
1st Destroyer Division (Commander: Birinci Sınıf Yüzbaşı Hüseyin Rauf Bey)
Mecidiye, Muâvenet-i Millîye, Gayret-i Vatâniye, Nümûne-i Hamiyet
2nd Destroyer Division (Commander: Yüzbaşı Hakkı Eşref Efendi)
Berk-i Satvet, Taşoz, Yarhisar, Basra
3rd Division (Commander: Korvet Kaptanı İsmail Bey)
 Âsâr-ı Tevfik, Samsun, Tîr-i Müjgan (workshop ship), İntibâh (salvage tug), Samsun (tug)

Sources 

Ottoman Navy
Balkan Wars orders of battle
Military units and formations of the Ottoman Empire in the Balkan Wars
Naval ships of the Ottoman Empire in the Balkan Wars
Lists of ships of the Ottoman Empire